The Apurímac brushfinch or Apurimac brushfinch (Atlapetes forbesi) is a species of bird in the family Passerellidae.

It is endemic to woodland and shrub in the Andes of southern Peru. It is sometimes included as a subspecies of the rufous-eared brush finch.

References

Apurímac brush finch
Birds of the Peruvian Andes
Endemic birds of Peru
Apurímac brush finch
Taxonomy articles created by Polbot